Several naval ships of Germany were named Bremse after the horse-fly:

, an armoured gunboat
 (1916), a 

, a 
s of the East German Volksmarine

German Navy ship names